In 224 AD, Ardashir defeated the Parthian Empire and replaced it with the Sasanian Empire. He began to raid Roman territory almost immediately after he had taken power at Ctesiphon. When Severus Alexander launched a massive invasion of the Persian Empire in the early 230s, the Persian forces drove it back inflicting heavy casualties on the Roman army. The Sasanians then besieged the Roman city of Nisibis in 235 or 237 and eventually conquered it.

References

Nisibis 235
Nisibis 235
Nisibis 235
Nisibis
Nisibis
Nisibis 235
Nisibis 235
Sieges of Nisibis